Alive! The Millennium Concert is a live album by the American hard rock band Kiss. It was released on November 21, 2006, as part of the Kiss Alive! 1975–2000 box set.

Album information
It was recorded on December 31, 1999, at BC Place Stadium in Vancouver, Canada and included songs that had never before been performed by the original lineup ("Heaven's on Fire", "I Love It Loud" and "Lick It Up").

It was originally intended to be released as Alive IV in 2000 but was shelved when Kiss' parent label Mercury was swallowed by the Universal/Vivendi merger. However, the album's version of "Rock and Roll All Nite" was included in The Box Set which was released on November 20, 2001. Although Universal later agreed to Kiss using Mercury to release what would become The Millennium Concert as Alive IV, it was shelved indefinitely and the band would release the Symphony: Alive IV album released on Kiss Records/Sanctuary Records in 2003. It was finally released on November 21, 2006, as part of the Kiss Alive! 1975–2000 box set.

An edition of the box set exclusive to Best Buy was advertised as including two exclusive bonus tracks (2,000 Man and God of Thunder) on The Millennium Concert disc. But due to an error, Best Buy only sold the standard box set that did not have the exclusive bonus tracks. In an attempt to correct this, a replacement disc was produced and small quantities were shipped to Best Buy locations where the discs were given out to customers who came back to complain that their box did not include the promised extra tracks.

Another bonus track, "Detroit Rock City", was released as an exclusive to the iTunes edition of the box set.

On October 14, 2014, The Millennium Concert was released on vinyl. This release is the only edition to include all previously-released tracks. However, it is still not the  entire concert, as "Cold Gin" and "Shock Me" remain unreleased.

Track listing

Vinyl Release

References

External links
Kiss - Alive: The Millennium Concert at Discogs

2006 live albums
Kiss (band) live albums
Mercury Records live albums
Sequel albums
Universal Music Group live albums